In mathematics, specifically in order theory and functional analysis, a filter  in an order complete vector lattice  is order convergent if it contains an order bounded subset (that is, is contained in an interval of the form ) and if  
 

Order convergence plays an important role in the theory of vector lattices because the definition of order convergence does not depend on any topology.

Definition 

Order continuity 

Related results 

In an order complete vector lattice  whose order is regular,  is of minimal type if and only if every order convergent filter in  converges when  is endowed with the order topology.

See also

References

   
  
  

Functional analysis
Order theory